Fayette is an unincorporated community in Perry Township, Boone County, in the U.S. state of Indiana.

History
The community was likely named for Gilbert du Motier, Marquis de Lafayette.

Geography

References

External links

Unincorporated communities in Boone County, Indiana
Unincorporated communities in Indiana